John Hopkins Lowden (born  1 May 1953) is a British art historian who is Professor of the History of Art at the Courtauld Institute, which he joined in 1982.

Lowden is a graduate of Cambridge University and previously taught at St. Andrews. His specialism is in illuminated manuscripts.

Selected publications
Early Christian and Byzantine Art. London: Phaidon Press, 1997.

References

Living people
British art historians
Academics of the Courtauld Institute of Art
Alumni of Emmanuel College, Cambridge
1953 births
Corresponding Fellows of the Medieval Academy of America

Historians of Byzantine art